Mokino is a rural locality (a village) in Kultayevskoye Rural Settlement, Permsky District, Perm Krai, Russia. The population was 319 as of 2010. There are 66 streets.

Geography 
Mokino is located 27 km southwest of Perm (the district's administrative centre) by road. Bashkultayevo is the nearest rural locality.

References 

Rural localities in Permsky District